Ras al-Khafji or Khafji (الخفجي) is a town on the border between Saudi Arabia and Kuwait.  It lies in what was before 1970 the Saudi Arabian–Kuwaiti neutral zone. The Japanese-owned Arabian Oil Company Ltd signed a concession agreement with the government of Saudi Arabia in December 1957 and with the government of Kuwait in July 1958 for exploration and development of hydrocarbon reserves in the offshore Neutral Zone. The Arabian Oil Company discovered the Khafji oil field in 1960 and the Hout oil field in 1963.

It was only after the discovery of these oil deposits off-shore of Khafji that a permanent demarcation of the neutral zone between Kuwait and Saudi Arabia was established, with Khafji formally located within Saudi Arabia. However, the agreement concluded that both states would still maintain joint rights to all natural resources within the designated neutral zone.  With the termination of the Arabian Oil Company lease to explore and extract within the area, operations within the Khafji Fields reverted to a joint venture between shareholder companies representing both states, with  production being split on a 50:50 agreement between Kuwait and Saudi Arabia.

Khafji's notoriety, however, is primarily owed to the Battle of Khafji, which took place in and around the town in 1991 and marked the high tide of Iraq's advance through Kuwait and into Saudi Arabia during the Persian Gulf War. Khafji's first prince was Prince Faisal bin Turki I, eldest grandson of the country's founder Ibn Saud, also known as King Abdulaziz.

History
Al-Khafji largely came into existence following the 1960 discovery of the Al-Khafji oil field. The expansion of oil exploration and drilling in the region led the city to gradually expand, generally keeping pace with a trend witnessed throughout the Kingdom.

First Gulf War
On January 29, 1991 the Iraqi army invaded Khafji following the invasion and subsequent occupation of Kuwait. Saudi, Qatari and Coalition forces compelled the Iraqi army to withdraw from the city on the January 31, 1991 as a consequence of the Battle of Khafji.

Post-Gulf War
In 1995, city officials declared the city safe and mine-free.

Location

Khafji is located in Saudi Arabia's Eastern Region along the coast of the Persian Gulf.

Climate
Khafji has a hot desert climate (Köppen climate classification BWh).

Khafji's future
The Saudi government, in conjunction with Aramco Gulf Operations Company, is promoting large-scale development projects in Khafji with the goal of transforming it into one of the major cities in the country. According to the Saudi government, Khafji is to be the headquarters of a new natural gas company. A separate government project in Khafji is to promote the city as an international tourist destination.  The project would publicize and promote Khafji's beaches on the Arabian Gulf during the summer and the temperate weather and desert camping in the winter.

Population
The population of Khafji is roughly 120,000 (2015). A significant proportion of the population is composed of oil company employees and their families, and thus a large proportion of residents came to Khafji from different cities in Saudi Arabia and Kuwait after 1960.

Education
The city lacks institutions offering post secondary education for men.  Khafji is home to the Girls Education College, a female-only college. In January 2009, Muhammed Al-Umair, Director of Colleges in the Eastern Province opened an investigation into the Girls Education College following reports of piles of garbage lying about the college going uncollected for weeks. Students portrayed toilets at the school as unusable, and the environment at the school was portrayed as lax to the point of being detrimental to scholastic endeavors.  The Girls Education College receives a portion of its funding from Chevron.

Healthcare

Until 1969, Khafji was served by a single hospital, the Company Hospital. In 1969, the Ministry of Health funded the construction of an additional two clinics. In 1988, Khafji National Polyclinic was established and turned into hospital by 2004 to be the pioneer in private medical service in the city. In 1996, Al Khafji Joint Operations Hospital (KJO Hospital) opened, and has since been expanded.  Previously, KJO Hospital used to provide healthcare for 7,000 inpatient and 80,000 outpatient visits per year. Currently Khafji General Hospital- since started by the end of 2005- became the main health institute in Khafji Governorate since it provides the health care for all citizens and eligible residents in all speciality areas -regarding the rapidly growing population- and rapidly expanding every day replacing the historical role of KJO hospital. Several private hospitals And private polyclinics  have also been established in Khafji to keep up with the needs of citizens and residents in the city, as well as the citizens of neighboring Kuwait, like Kingdom of medicine, Almanar complex and was most recently the launch of Alrahmah Medical Complex in 2010.

Transportation

Airport
The city is served by King Fahd International Airport, although there is a small airfield in the city (Khafji Airport) owned by Aramco Gulf Operations Company that is not open for public use or commercial service.

Geographically, located 230 km to the west is the nearest domestic airport offering commercial flights (Al Qaisumah/Hafr Al Batin Airport) which has limited domestic flights, however no direct road exists which makes driving distance approximately 300 km and no longer the closest airport. King Fahd International Airport in Dammam is the closest airport in the country with international services at a driving distance of 270 km, despite Kuwait International Airport being the closest commercial airport overall to the city.

Culture and recreation
Many residents of Khafji travel to Kuwait or, to a lesser extent, to Dammam to shop. Both cities offer a greater variety of products and large and well-established markets in contrast to the young but growing retail options in Khafji.

See also 

 List of cities and towns in Saudi Arabia

References

Populated places in Eastern Province, Saudi Arabia
Port cities and towns in Saudi Arabia
Port cities and towns of the Persian Gulf
Kuwait–Saudi Arabia relations